Puca Punta (possibly from Quechua puka red, punta peak; ridge, "red peak (or ridge)") is a mountain in the Vilcanota mountain range in the Andes of Peru, about  high. It is located in the Cusco Region, Canchis Province, Pitumarca District, and in the Quispicanchi Province, Ocongate District. Puka Punta lies southwest of Callangate, northeast of Yanajaja and east of Jatun Punta.

References

Mountains of Cusco Region
Mountains of Peru